Joseph L. Walcott was the first African American to own a nightclub in New England.

Early life
A Barbadian who immigrated to America in 1910, he joined his brother in Boston. "Wally" worked at many jobs including running a taxi service where one of his customers was Boston mayor James Michael Curley. Mayor Curley helped Walcott to get a liquor license and in 1947 he used his savings to start Wally's Paradise at 428 Massachusetts Avenue in the South End of Boston, Massachusetts.

Wally brought many new musical acts to Boston, including Sarah Vaughn, Lena Horne, Coleman Hawkins, Oscar Peterson and Red Garland were just some of the legendary performers who played at Walcott's nightclub.

After Wally's death in 1998 at age 101, his three children took over the bar, and today Wally's Cafe is still owned and managed by his family: Walcott's daughter, Elynor, and his three grandsons, Paul, Frank, and Lloyd Poindexter. It is the oldest jazz club in the United States to be maintained and held by one family.

References

 Adrian Walker, "Riff may sign Club's last note," The Boston Globe, Thursday, January 21, 1999
 Thomas, Jack, "Ghosts of yesterday: Memories of Boston's jazz heyday live on at Wally's Cafe", The Boston Globe, August 8, 2005 
 Wally's Cafe website

External links 
 Sunday Jam with Jason Palmer at Wally's Cafe - All About Jazz

Barbadian emigrants to the United States